Used is a deserted village under the local government of the municipality of Sabiñánigo, Alto Gállego, Huesca, Aragon, Spain.

Located near the Sierra y Cañones de Guara natural park, the surrounding area is a very good place for speleology and sports like rock climbing and canyoning.

See also
  Used (Huesca)

References

External links
  Council of Sabiñánigo
 Sierra y Cañones de Guara natural park at spain.info

Municipalities in the Province of Huesca
Sabiñánigo